Palaeospheniscus bergi is a species of the extinct penguin genus Palaeospheniscus.

Etymology 
The species is named for Carlos Berg, a member of the La Plata Museum of Natural Sciences staff at the time when Moreno worked there.

Description 
Many bones referrable to this species have been recovered from the Early to Middle Miocene Gaiman and Puerto Madryn Formations and the El Foyel Group. Known localities are Trelew in Chubut Province and Puerto San Julián in Santa Cruz Province, Argentina.

Some recent researchers have considered Palaeospheniscus gracilis to be a synonym for this species.

Taxonomy 
Bones of this species were described as no less than 6 "species" (including the correct one) from 3 "genera" by Florentino Ameghino in a single publication. The synonyms are as follows:
Palaeospheniscus bergii (lapsus) Ameghino, 1891
Paraspheniscus bergi Ameghino, 1905
Palaeospheniscus planus Ameghino, 1905
Palaeospheniscus rothi Ameghino, 1905
Pseudospheniscus interplanus Ameghino, 1905
Pseudospheniscus planus Ameghino, 1905
Pseudospheniscus concavus Ameghino, 1905
Pseudospheniscus convexus Ameghino, 1905
Either Pseudospheniscus interplanus or P. planus, as well as either Pseudospheniscus concavus or P. convexus, are a lapsus too.

References

Further reading 
 Ameghino, Florentino (1905): Enumeracion de los impennes fósiles de Patagonia y de la Isla Seymour. An. Mus. Nac. Buenos Aires 3(6): 97-167, 4 figures, 8 plates.
 Moreno, Francisco "Perito" & Mercerat, A. (1891): Catálogo de los pájaros fósiles de la República Argentina conservados en el Museo de La Plata. Anales del Museo de La Plata 1: 7-71, 21 plates.
 Simpson, George Gaylord (1946): Fossil penguins. Bull. Am. Mus. Nat. Hist. 87: 7-99. PDF fulltext
 Simpson, George Gaylord (1971): Conspectus of Patagonian fossil penguins. American Museum Novitates 2488: 1-37. PDF fulltext

Palaeospheniscus
Extinct penguins
Miocene birds of South America
Laventan
Colloncuran
Friasian
Neogene Argentina
Fossils of Argentina
Gaiman Formation
Fossil taxa described in 1891